The discography of Take That, a British pop music group, consists of eight studio albums, two compilation albums, thirty-two singles, three live albums, one extended play and fourteen video albums.

Take That made their debut in the United Kingdom in 1991 with "Do What U Like". "Promises" and then "Once You've Tasted Love" followed in 1992. They were only minor hits in the UK. The band's breakthrough single was a cover of the 1970s Tavares hit "It Only Takes a Minute", which peaked at number seven on the UK Singles Chart. This success was followed by the track "I Found Heaven" and "A Million Love Songs", top 15 and top 10 singles respectively. Their cover of the Barry Manilow disco hit "Could It Be Magic" was their biggest hit to date, peaking at number three in the UK. Their first album, Take That & Party, was also released in 1992. The following year saw the release of their second album Everything Changes. It spawned four UK number one singles; "Pray", "Relight My Fire", "Babe" and the title track "Everything Changes". The fifth single "Love Ain't Here Anymore" reached number three. Everything Changes also saw the band gain international success. In 1995 came their third album, Nobody Else, containing another 3 UK number ones. After the first single "Sure" was released, the second single from the album, "Back for Good" became their biggest hit single reaching number one in 31 countries around the world. In the summer of 1995 band member Robbie Williams left the band. Undaunted by the loss, Take That continued to promote Nobody Else as a four-piece, scoring another UK number one single with "Never Forget". In February 1996 Take That formally announced that they were disbanding. This was followed by the Greatest Hits compilation, which contained a new recording, a cover of the Bee Gees' "How Deep Is Your Love", the band's eighth number one single.

In November 2005, the band returned to the UK Albums Chart with Never Forget – The Ultimate Collection, a new compilation of their hit singles, which reached number 2. In May 2006, the band announced they were reforming after ten years. The band's comeback album Beautiful World, entered the UK Albums Chart at number one and is currently the 35th best selling album in UK music history. The first single from the album, "Patience" was released in November 2006 and reached number one in its second week staying there for four weeks. This was followed by "Shine", another number one single. Other singles released were "I'd Wait for Life" and hit single "Rule the World", a UK number two over the Christmas period of 2007. The first single "Greatest Day" from their next album, The Circus, debuted at number one in the UK in November 2008. The album followed a week later and also debuted at number one. The album's second single "Up All Night", peaked at number fourteen in the UK and was followed by "Said It All" peaking at number nine. In November 2009, Take That released their first live album, The Greatest Day – Take That Present: The Circus Live which reached number 3 in the UK and went platinum.

The following year, Take That announced they were to re-form as a five-piece and release an album. This album was titled Progress and was released on 15 November. It debuted at number 1, selling 235,000 copies on its first day and 520,000 copies in its first week becoming the second fastest selling album of all time. It achieved success across Europe debuting at number one in seven countries and top 10 in many others. In 2014, their seventh studio album, III, was released. It is their first studio album since 2010's Progress and the first to feature the band as a trio, following the departures of Jason Orange and Robbie Williams. The album was released on 28 November 2014 and went to number one in the UK, preceded by lead single "These Days" which became their 12th number one UK single.

In 2016 they announced their eighth studio album, Wonderland, released on 24 March 2017.

Albums

Studio albums

Live albums

Compilation albums

Import

Box sets

Extended plays

 A In certain territories, Progressed charted in conjunction with Progress under the same title.

Singles

As lead artist

As featured artist

Promotional singles

Other charted songs

Music videos

Video/DVD releases

References

Notes

Sources

External links
Official website
Danish discography

Take That
Discographies of British artists
Pop music group discographies